Dizjan (also Romanized as Dīzjān; also known as Dezkān and Dīzkān) is a village in Vardasht Rural District, in the Central District of Semirom County, Isfahan Province, Iran. At the 2006 census, its population was 359, in 89 families.

References 

Populated places in Semirom County